László Csaba (Budapest, 9 October 1924 – Budapest, 18 January 1995) was a Hungarian architect.

References 

1924 births

1995 deaths

20th-century Hungarian architects